Leon Luke Mendonca (born 13 March 2006) is an Indian chess player. He is the sixty-seventh Indian to qualify for the title of Grandmaster, which FIDE awarded him in January 2021.

Chess career
Mendonca became an International Master (IM) in 2019 at the age of 12 years, 11 months and 3 days. He got stuck in Eastern Europe due to COVID lockdowns in March, 2020. He attained his first Grandmaster norm at the Rigochess Grandmaster tournament in Hungary in October 2020. Within a span of 21 days, he won another Grandmaster tournament at Budapest earning him the second Grandmaster norm. Mendonca achieved his third and final norm in December 2020 by finishing second at the Vergani Cup in Bassano del Grappa, Italy. He became the second grandmaster from the state of Goa after Anurag Mhamal achieving the feat at 14 years, 9 months and 17 days. He was officially awarded the title of grandmaster (GM) in January 2021.

See also
 List of Indian chess players § Grandmasters
 Chess in India

References

External links
 
 
 Leon Luke Mendonca chess games at 365Chess.com

2006 births
Living people
Chess grandmasters
Indian chess players
Sportspeople from Goa